Elizabeth Conway Symons, Baroness Symons of Vernham Dean  (born 14 April 1951) is a British politician and trade unionist. A member of the Labour Party, she was Minister of State for the Middle East from 2001 to 2005. She is former General Secretary of the FDA Trade Union and has served as the Chair of the Arab British Chamber of Commerce (ABCC) since 2010.

Early life
The daughter of Ernest Symons, Chairman of HM Board of Inland Revenue, Symons was educated at Putney High School for Girls and Girton College, Cambridge. She was an administration trainee at the Department of the Environment from 1974 to 1977. She then worked for the Inland Revenue Staff Federation from 1977 to 1989 and was General Secretary of the Association of First Division Civil Servants from 1989 to 1997. She resigned from this post following her appointment as a working peer.

Political life

Symons was created a Labour life peer as Baroness Symons of Vernham Dean, of Vernham Dean in the County of Hampshire, on 7 October 1996. From May 1997 to June 1999, she took her first government post, serving as a junior Foreign Office Minister. From 1999 until 2001, she was Minister of State for Defence Procurement and, from 2001 until 2003, Minister of State for Trade. From 2001 until 2005, she was Minister of State for Foreign Affairs with responsibility for the Middle East, International Security, Consular and Personal Affairs, and Deputy Leader of the House of Lords.

Symons was or remains a member of the British-American Project (BAP). It has a membership of 600 leaders and opinion formers, drawn equally from both countries, according to The Guardian, and holds an annual conference at which everything that is said is officially off-the-record. also serves on the board of governors of the Ditchley Foundation.

In 2001, she married her long-standing partner, Phil Bassett, a former writer at The Times. They have a son, James, born in 1985. In October 2002, Bassett was appointed to the Strategic Communications Unit in 10 Downing Street, leaving in September 2003 to become special adviser to Lord Falconer of Thoroton, the Lord Chancellor and Secretary of State for Constitutional Affairs.

She is a Senior Network Member at the European Leadership Network (ELN).

Corporate career
Symons was not given a job in the re-shuffle after the general election of 5 May 2005, and became a non-executive director of British Airways.

Symons sits on the board of trustees of the John Smith Memorial Trust, an NGO set up in 1995 in memory of the late Labour party leader John Smith.

Conflict of interest allegations

The Guardian alleged in its issue of 9 January 2005 that Symons may have used her office to give "special treatment" to David Mills, husband of Culture Secretary Tessa Jowell. Mills was seeking her assistance in sidestepping a U.S. trade embargo against Iran in order to sell $200 million worth of British Aerospace jets to that country.

On 9 February 2006, The Guardian mentioned her as one several former government ministers who had accepted lucrative positions as company directors and consultants. In the case of Symons, the companies involved were British Airways, law firm DLA Piper, and the Peninsular and Oriental Steam Navigation Company (P&O).

In 2009 similar allegations were made when she took a lucrative post with UK investment bank MerchantBridge, which  made millions from contracts in post-war Iraq, and also when she became a member of the National Economic Development Board of Libya shortly before the release of Abdelbaset Al Megrahi, who was convicted of the Lockerbie bombing. Symons resigned from the National Economic Development Board in 2011 in the midst of a popular uprising against the government of Muammar Gaddafi, one day after she had made remarks which appeared to praise Gaddafi's ‘sound ideology’. Symons said the remarks had been made facetiously.

References 

1951 births
Alumni of Girton College, Cambridge
Members of the Privy Council of the United Kingdom
General Secretaries of the FDA (trade union)
Civil servants in the Department of the Environment
Life peeresses created by Elizabeth II
Fellows of Girton College, Cambridge
Labour Party (UK) life peers
Living people
Members of the General Council of the Trades Union Congress
Women trade unionists